NGC 416 is a globular cluster located in the constellation Tucana. It was discovered on September 5, 1826 by James Dunlop. It was described by Dreyer as "faint, pretty small, round, gradually brighter middle." At an aperture of 31 arcseconds, its apparent V-band magnitude is 11.42, but at this wavelength, it has 0.25 magnitudes of interstellar extinction.

NGC 416 is about 6.6 billion years old. All else equal, older star clusters have higher mass-to-luminosity ratios; that is, they have lower luminosities for the same mass.

References

External links
 

0416
18260905
Tucana (constellation)
Small Magellanic Cloud
Open clusters